Although the tournament was played from January to July 1999, this is officially known as the 1998–99 season in the Honduran football league, it was also the last non-Apertura-Clausura format season played. Club Deportivo Olimpia conquered its 14th title in its history.

1998–99 teams

 Broncos (promoted)
 Marathón
 Motagua
 Olimpia
 Platense
 Universidad
 Real España
 Real Maya
 Victoria
 Vida

Regular season
 Also serves as 1998 Honduran Cup

Standings

Results
 As of 12 May 1999

Final round

Hexagonal

 Olimpia won 3–0 on aggregate.

 Motagua 3–3 Victoria on aggregate.  Motagua advanced on regular season record.  Victoria advanced as best loser.

 Real España won 3–2 on aggregate.

Semifinals

 Olimpia 1–1 Victoria on aggregate.  Olimpia advanced on regular season record.

 Real España won 4–2 on aggregate.

Final

 Olimpia won 2–1 on aggregate.

Top scorer
  Sergio Machado (Platense) with 11 goals

Squads

Controversy
 Olimpia had field Wilmer Velásquez on the Final round illegally against Platense and Victoria, the "Jaibos" protested the irregularity without success and Olimpia won the championship.

References

Liga Nacional de Fútbol Profesional de Honduras seasons
1998–99 in Honduran football
Honduras